Lukáš Křeček (born 18 September 1986 in Kladno) is a Czech football player who currently plays for Vlašim on loan from FC Zbrojovka Brno.

References

External links

 Zbrojovka Profile

1986 births
Living people
Czech footballers
Czech First League players
FC Sellier & Bellot Vlašim players
FC Zbrojovka Brno players
SFC Opava players
Association football midfielders
Sportspeople from Kladno